Rothia aeria is a Gram-positive bacterium.

References

Further reading

External links 

LPSN
Type strain of Rothia aeria at BacDive -  the Bacterial Diversity Metadatabase

Micrococcaceae
Bacteria described in 2004